The Namsenfjorden or Namsfjorden is a fjord in Trøndelag county, Norway. It runs southeast from the Folda firth, between the mainland in the south and the island of Otterøya in the north, past the island of Hoddøya, to the Namsen river estuary in the town of Namsos. The banks of the fjord are mostly wooded and not very high. Near the town of Namsos, the Løgnin fjord arm branches to the south all the way to the village of Sjøåsen in Namsos. Other villages along the fjord include Statland, Tøttdalen, Skomsvoll, Bangsund, and Spillum.

Media gallery

See also
 List of Norwegian fjords

References

Namsos
Flatanger
Fjords of Trøndelag